Storm Products Inc. is an American company involved in the manufacture and sale of bowling balls and bowling-related accessories. The company headquarters and main manufacturing facility are in Brigham City, Utah, with two smaller facilities in California and Texas. Storm has produced many bowling balls used in the sport by competitive players, and has numerous sponsorship agreements on both the PBA and PWBA Tours. Storm currently employs about 165 people (about 120 in Utah). The company manufactures about 500,000 balls a year, and ships to 70 countries.

Storm Products also owns the Roto Grip and 900 Global bowling ball brands.

History
Storm Products was founded by Bill and Barbara Chrisman in 1985. The company originated as High Score Products, a chemical company that developed bowling ball cleaners. In 1991, with assistance from Bill's friend and fellow bowling enthusiast Keith Orton, the company began manufacturing high-performance bowling balls, creating a subsidiary called Storm. At the time, High Score Products was still the parent company, but by 1994, the company changed its name to Storm Products Inc.

In 1997, Storm acquired the Roto Grip brand of bowling balls. Storm has also acquired the Master brand of bowling accessories. In 2000, Storm Products Inc. patented a process to add fragrances to bowling balls.

In 2014, Storm Products announced it had made an investment in Global Manufacturing LLC of San Antonio, Texas, makers of the 900 Global brand of bowling balls and 3G bowling shoes. However, Storm stated that 900 Global will operate as an independent company with separate research and design teams. Further, bowlers with Storm sponsorships on the PBA Tour could not use 900 Global equipment, and vice versa. In April 2020, 900 Global's manufacturing moved from Texas to Storm's Utah facility, due to executive orders by the Governor of Texas related to the COVID-19 pandemic. The design, research, development and marketing teams remained in San Antonio.

On September 29, 2020, Storm fully acquired all assets of Global Manufacturing, adding 900 Global and 3G products to the Storm marketing portfolio. As a result, Storm and Roto Grip sponsored players on the PBA and PWBA tours can now use 900 Global equipment, and vice versa.

Notable Storm-sponsored bowlers

List as of May 31, 2022.

Storm
Diandra Asbaty
Josie Barnes
Jason Belmonte
Verity Crawley
Norm Duke
Tom Hess
Leanne Hulsenberg
Liz Johnson
Kelly Kulick
Thomas Larsen
François Lavoie
Tim Mack
Danielle McEwan
Randy Pedersen
Mike Scroggins
Jesper Svensson
 Darren Tang
Kyle Troup
Chris Via
Pete Weber

Roto Grip
Tom Baker
Carolyn Dorin-Ballard
Stefanie Johnson
Wes Malott
 BJ Moore
Shannon O'Keefe
Kristopher Prather
Rocio Restrepo
Anthony Simonsen
 Michael Tang
Stuart Williams

900 Global
Chris Barnes
Sam Cooley
Daria Pająk
Sean Rash
Stephanie Zavala

References

Ten-pin bowling equipment manufacturers